Gennady Viktorovich Samokhin (Геннадий Викторович Самохин; born July 14, 1971 in Simferopol) is a Crimean speleologist who holds the depth world record of cave diving in a sump at −2,196 meters, attained while exploring the Krubera Cave in 2012. He was educated and works in the Tavrida National V.I. Vernadsky University (now Crimean Federal University).

References

External links
 Ukrainian Speleological Association interview

Living people
Speleologists
Scientists from Simferopol
Tavrida National V.I. Vernadsky University alumni
1971 births